Music Detected is the fifth album by the musical group Deep Forest. The record was released on May 14, 2002  via Saint George label.

Track listing
All songs by Eric Mouquet and Michel Sanchez.
"India" – 4:07
"Endangered Species" – 6:18
"Soul Elevator" – 4:12
"Computer Machine" – 5:12
"Yuki Song" (featuring Beverly Jo Scott) – 5:23
"Beauty in Your Eyes" – 4:23
"Elemental" (featuring Beverly Jo Scott) – 5:24
"Far East" – 0:58
"Deep Blue Sea" (featuring Anggun) – 4:16
"Will You Be Ready" (featuring Chitose Hajime and Angela McCluskey) – 5:18
"In the Evening" – 1:36
"Dignity" (featuring Beverly Jo Scott) – 5:23
"Endangered Species (Galleon Remix Radio Edit)" – 3:59
"Tokyo Street" (Japanese Edition Bonus Track)
"Honjo Song" (Previously Unreleased)

Charts

Personnel
Eric Mouquet – arrangement, keyboards, and programmation
Michel Sanchez – arrangement, keyboards, and programmation
Beverly Jo Scott – vocals
Angela McCluskey – vocals
Anggun – vocals on "Deep Blue Sea"
David Fall – drums
Phillipe Paradis – guitar
Brij Narayan – sarod

References

External links
 Details, samples and lyrics with translations from Music Detected

2002 albums
Deep Forest albums